The Argus 140/150 hp 6-cylinder aircraft engine from 1913 was a six-cylinder, water cooled inline engine built by the German Argus Motoren company from 1913 to 1914.

It was used in some German prewar racing aircraft and, most notably, also powered some of the Sikorsky Ilya Muromets aircraft.

The engine design however was relatively short lived and was succeeded already in 1914 by a new line-up of completely redesigned six-cylinder engines ranging from 120 to 200 hp, of which the 120 hp Argus As II became the most well known.

Design and development

The first mentioning of the 150 hp six-cylinder Argus engine being offered in the Jeannin-Stahltaube can be found in early 1913.

Compared with the preceding Argus six-cylinder engines once again the external components have been rearranged.
Besides that the design of the engine remained largely similar to the preceding Argus engines.

The cylinders were of cast iron, cast in pairs of two cylinders, with the cooling jackets integral in the casting.
There were two overhead valves per cylinder, which were operated via pushrods and rocker arms from the camshaft on the left side of the engine.
The intake valves were oriented to the center of each cylinder pair, and their intake ducts were conjoined within the casting into a single external port facing to the left side of the engine.

Two Cudell-G.A.-carburettors were placed centrally on the left side of the engine in close proximity to each other.
A heating jacket, integrated into the coolant circulation, enclosed both carburettors, which fed separately into the two intake pipes of the intake manifold.
The intake manifold was made out of cast aluminum and consisted of two separate intake pipes, which fed into single distribution pipe, which then connected to all three cylinder pairs.

The pistons were made of cast iron and had two piston rings.
Each cylinder pair was fixated to the crankcase by six bolts.
The cylinders were axially offset to the crankshaft, which was supported by two inner plain bearings and two outer ball bearings.

The crankcase was made of aluminum and cast in separate upper and lower half parts, with the upper half having six mounting arms cast into it.
The engine case was divided into three separate chambers by internal walls at the inner crankshaft bearings, with each chamber having a separate breather on the right hand side.
Compared to the earlier 115 hp six-cylinder Argus the engine case had been slightly redesigned, with most notably the pedestals being elongated to accommodate for the additional height of the oil- and water pump assembly.

The centrifugal water pump has been moved to the lower right at the control side of the engine, mounted together with the oil pump on a transverse shaft, which was driven by helical gears from the crankshaft end.
The water pump fed the coolant to the water cooled cylinders as well as to the carburettor's heating jacket from the left side.
Lubrication was done by a combination of splash lubrication and additional forced lubrication of the plain bearings with fresh oil fed by the oil pump.

The two magnetos were mounted with their shafts in parallel to the engine, with one magneto placed on either side at the control end.
The magnetos were driven via spur gears from the camshaft gear and from the crankshaft via an intermediate idler gear respectively.

Variants

Argus 120/130 hp six-cylinder
(1913-1914), 120-130 hp,  bore and stroke
Argus 140/150 hp six-cylinder
(1913-1914), 140-150 hp,  bore and stroke

Applications

Aviatik P.14 (Argus 120/130 hp, e.g. Aviatik biplane of Willy Trück in German South West Africa)
Jeannin Stahltaube (e.g. Argus 120/130 hp, Prinz-Heinrich-Flug 1914, No. 24 with pilot René Freindt)
Sikorsky Ilya Muromets No 128 (two Argus 140 hp and two Argus 125 hp engines)

Specifications (Argus 140/150 hp)

See also

References

Notes

Bibliography 

1910s aircraft piston engines
Argus aircraft engines